Yacuiba Airport is an airport located  north of Yacuiba, a city in the Tarija Department of Bolivia.

The runway is in a north–south aligned valley, with rising terrain to the east, and the Cordillera Central mountains  to the west.

The Yacuiba non-directional beacon (Ident: YAC) is located on the field.

Airlines and destinations

Accidents, Disasters, and incidents
 On 4 February 1964, a Douglas C-47 Skytrain operated by Lloyd Aéreo Boliviano crashed shortly after takeoff killing two.
 20 October 1973, A Boeing 737 operated by Aerolíneas Argentinas was highjacked and landed at Yacuiba where 38 passengers were released.
 2 June 1980, A Fairchild F-27 operated by Lloyd Aéreo Boliviano crashed while on Approach to the airport killing all 13 people on board.
 17 January 2003, A British Aerospace Jetstream operated by Servicio Aéreo Vargas España crashed shortly into trees while attempting to take off, no one was killed.

See also
Transport in Bolivia
List of airports in Bolivia

References

External links 
Yacuiba Airport at OpenStreetMap
Yacuiba Airport at OurAirports

Airports in Tarija Department